The Sea of Tranquility is the debut album of the Norwegian band Neograss, released on August 2, 2010.

Track listing
«The Sea of Tranquility» (Bekkevold/Andreassen) – 29:35
Introduction and Exposition
Part I : Lunar Landscapes
Part II : Tranquility
Part III : Underwater Abyss (Instr.)
Part IV : Voyage of the Damned (Instr.)
Part V : The resurrection (Reprise)
Development
Part VI : Silencio
Part VII : Higher Ground (Instr.)
Recapitulation and Coda
Part VIII : Impact (Instr.)
Part IX : Voyage of the Illuminator (Instr. Reprise)
Part X : Terminus (Coda)

Personnel
Neograss
Emil Bekkevold – vocals, banjo
Tore Morten Andreassen – Acoustic guitars, mellotron
Åsmund Wilter Kildal Eriksson - Doublebass
Aleksander Kostopoulos – Drums

Technical
Production – Emil Bekkevold, Tore Morten Andreassen
Mixing – Jon Marius Aareskjold
Engineering – Håkon Elias Pettersen

References

2010 debut albums